Legacy High School (LHS) is a public high school located in Bismarck, North Dakota. Legacy was founded following a $55 million bond approval in 2012, with students attending classes at other locations run by Bismarck Public Schools while the campus was under construction. Before Legacy was established, the last public high school to open in Bismarck was Century High School in 1975. The school has a graduation rate of 96%.

History 
Legacy High School was established with the passage of a $55 million bond for the school's construction in 2012. In the 2013–2014 school year while the school was under construction, freshmen attended classes at the Bismarck State College Career Academy. During the following year, freshmen and sophomores were moved to the Hughes Education Center, the central administration building for Bismarck Public Schools. Finally, in the 2015–2016 school year, students attended school in the finished campus at 3400 East Calgary Avenue.

In the 2016–2017 school year, Legacy had its first graduating class.

Academics

Graduation 
In order to graduate, students must attain 24 total credits, with 15 of those being core academic credits. The specific credit requirements are as follows:

 English - 4 credits
 Mathematics - 3 credits
 Physical Education - 2 credits
 Science - 3 credits
 Social Studies - 3 credits
 Elective credits (foreign or Native American languages, fine arts, or career and technical education courses) - 3 credits
Additionally, students who meet all graduation requirements prior to the beginning of the second semester of their senior year may graduate at the end of their first semester.

Honors and Advanced Placement 
Students in their sophomore year or freshmen who have completed either Physical Science or English 9 in summer school are eligible to take Honors Biology or Honors English 10.

Legacy also offers many Advanced Placement classes, which as of 2023, includes:

 Advanced Placement English Language and Composition (AP Lang; AP English 11)
 Advanced Placement English Literature and Composition (AP Lit; AP English 12)
 Advanced Placement Probability and Statistics (AP Stats)
 Advanced Placement Calculus AB and BC (AP Calc)
 Advanced Placement Biology (AP Bio)
 Advanced Placement Chemistry (AP Chem)
 Advanced Placement Physics 1
 Advanced Placement Physics 2
 Advanced Placement Environmental Science (APES)
 Advanced Placement United States History (APUSH)
 Advanced Placement United States Government and Politics (AP Gov)
 Advanced Placement Psychology (AP Psych)
 Advanced Placement Computer Science Principles (APCSP)
 Advanced Placement Computer Science A (AP CompSci)
 Advanced Placement Music Theory

Dual Credit 
As of 2023, many courses at Legacy allow students to enroll in a dual-credit program which will award college credits to students who successfully complete the course. Students can also participate in a program of dual credit which will award students an associate degree upon graduation.

Modular schedule 
At Legacy, every week consists of 5 days each with their own individual schedules for staff and students which repeat the following week. Each day is broken down into twenty-two 20-minute mods during which classes take place. Normal academic classes can be between 2-4 mods ranging from 40–80 minutes, which are colloquially called "40s", "60s", and 80s". When students have no classes at a given time in their schedule, it is called Saber Time (after the school's mascot), during which students are expected to use the time to study, catch up on homework for classes, or eat lunch. Staff at Legacy have similar "prep time" during which they are able to prepare for upcoming classes or grade.

Legacy has an open campus policy, which allows sophomores and higher to leave the school during their Saber Time, usually to return home for rest or to get food outside of school for lunch.

Activities

Athletics 
Legacy has a track, football, and soccer field just off the main campus, as well as other sports fields sponsored by Sanford Health built neighboring the school. Legacy is a member of the Western Dakota Association and participates in WDA events yearly.

Unified Inclusive Sports 
Inclusive sports at Legacy allows students of all abilities to participate on the same team for sports like flag football, bowling, and whiffle ball.

Fine arts 
Legacy offers support for the fine arts in both extracurriculars (debate, drama, speech), and offers band, choir, and orchestra classes for credit in a dedicated wing. Legacy was the first in the Bismarck public school district to have a dedicated orchestra room.

Student organizations 
Legacy has over 10 student extracurricular organizations for students to participate in outside of normal school hours, including the school's own esports league, HOSA, FCA, Science Olympiad, and DECA.

Science Olympiad 
Legacy's Science Olympiad (SciOly) program competes yearly in Science Olympiad competitions for science and engineering. Legacy has previously won in the 2019 and 2021 state competitions, though lost in the 2022 competition.

LHS Historical Society 
In 2022, the LHS Historical Society (LHSHS) entered a group website submission into the National History Day in North Dakota virtual event and won, going onto the national competition where they competed but did not win.

References 



Schools in North Dakota